The Day The Earth Stood Still is the 14th studio album by American singer-songwriter Willie Nile, released on August 13, 2021 by River House Records, it was co-produced by Nile and Stewart Lerman who has worked with Nile on nine of his previous albums. Grammy-award-winning musician Steve Earle is a guest artist on this album.

Background
Upon seeing the deserted streets and boarded up stores of New York City because of Covid-19, Nile was reminded of scenes from the 1951 sci-fi movie The Day the Earth Stood Still. Nile uses the phrase "Klaatu barada nikto" in the chorus of the title track of the album. Drawing from his Covid lockdown experiences, in June 2020, he began writing songs for the album.

A few years earlier, Nile had been introduced to Congressman John Lewis by Nile's friend, Congressman Joe Crowley. Lewis passed away on July 17, 2020.  Nile and Frankie Lee wrote Justice Bell in honor of Lewis and his band recorded it, coincidentally, on January 6, 2021, the day of the Washington insurrection.

Nile says "Blood on Your Hands" is a song about dancing with the devil.  "If you dance with the devil you can get blood on your hands".  Nile invited his friend and neighbor Steve Earle to join him on that song.

"Way of the Heart" was recorded in 2009 and brought out as an ending for this album. 

Photographer Cristina Arrigoni photographed New York City street performer John Figueroa-Gonzalez for the cover photo and other photos in the album.

Critical reception

Jon Blistein of Rolling Stone says ""Blood on Your Hands" is a steady stomping rock cut that finds Nile and Earle trading searing verses about human nature’s more sinister qualities".

John Amen in No Depression: "a project that oozes an ebullient ’70s-rock-and-pop vibe, the 73-year-old delivering some of the more infectious songs of his career".

Richard Marcus from Blogcritics: The Day The Earth Stood Still shows Nile to be as versatile as ever. Equally at home rocking the house down as he is singing an intimate song from behind his piano he lives up to his reputation as one of the troubadours of our times. This is a great album of timely and intelligent music a heartfelt and aware songwriter."

Lee Zimmerman from American Songwriter: "The Day The Earth Stood Still easily measures up to every one of Nile’s preceding efforts—taut, tough, and tenacious, and driven by sheer grit and gravitas, as well as passion and purpose"

Steve Horowitz in PopMatters says "Nile is a national treasure who brings rock to the masses, and while he may sing about The Day the Earth Stood Still because of the recent pandemic, he’s still moving and grooving.

Gene Knapp from Elmore Magazine writes:  "Nile uses his masterful way with words to epitomize the world in its greatness and its fallacies".

Jim Hynes writes in Glide Magazine: "Nile is one of the best combinations of songwriter and rocker we’ve had over the past three decades and his albums seem to get progressively better each time out.

Damian McNairney opines in Folk/Tumble:  "Anyone fortunate enough to witness Willie Nile perform live will know that he delivers an energetic show of street smart rock and roll that never fails to leave his audience with a smile on their faces".

New York City reviewer Kevin Korber in Spectrum Culture writes: "The Day the Earth Stood Still can remind us of the kind of power that style can have in the hands of a craftsman like Willie Nile. 

John Apice writes in Americana Highways; "His latest polished, personal & powerful 11-cut The Day The Earth Stood Still is filled with brilliant songs, & literate lyrics".

Darryl Sterdan of Tinnitist: "The veteran New York rocker kicks up his heels with a raucous, high-energy outing. Willie Nile has tapped into his own lockdown experience as a source of inspiration for the set of haunting new songs that comprise his emotion-charged new release".

From the UK, Mark Engleson in Lyric Magazine says: "Nile is a powerful topical songwriter, one of the great chronicles of twenty-first American life and society, and of his adopted home city. His writing crackles with intelligence, passion, and insight, and his music is rock’n’roll of the first stripe.

Track listing

Personnel 
Musicians
 Willie Nile – electric & acoustic guitars, piano, vocals
 Jimi K. Bones - electric & acoustic guitars, percussion / loops
 Johnny Pisano – bass, backing vocals
 Jon Weber - drums, percussion
 Andy Burton - Hammond B3, piano, glockenspiel
 Steve Earle - vocal on Blood On Your Hands
 James Maddock - backing vocals
 Joe Crowley - backing vocals
 Frankie Lee - backing vocals, percussion
 Marc Jonson - backing vocals, piano, tubular bells, glockenspiel
 Stewart Smith - electric guitar on Way of The Heart
 Steward Lerman - bass on Way of The Heart

Production and additional personnel
 Produced by Stewart Lerman and Willie Nile
 Executive Producer: Kevin Collins, Rob Steele
 Associate Producer: Big Jer LaPorte (for Barry), Mark A. Moore
 Engineered and Mixed by James Frazee and Steward Lerman at Hobo Sound, Weehawken, NJ
 Mastered by Greg Calbi at Sterling Sound, Edgewater, NJ
 Additional Production and Engineering by Jimi K. Bones at JonesBones Studios, NYC
 Recorded at Hobo Sound, Weehawken, NJ
 Photography – Cristina Arrigoni at CristinaArrigoniphotography.com
 Art direction – Deborah Maniaci 
 Photo of John Lewis by Dominick Titino
 Media – Cary Baker
 Radio – Brad Hunt
 Booking – Adam Bauer

References

2021 albums
Willie Nile albums
Albums produced by Stewart Lerman